Nothing Personal is a 1980 Canadian-American romantic comedy film starring Suzanne Somers and Donald Sutherland. Sutherland plays a professor who objects to the killing of baby seals. Somers, a Harvard-educated attorney, tries to aid him.

The film has been extremely poorly reviewed.  Cinema Canada criticized the film's "coarse, obvious humour", "unfunny and unexciting" car chases, and claimed that the film's principal concern was "speed, not coherence".
Leonard Maltin described Nothing Personal as an "inane romantic comedy", while TV Guide described the film as "tedious, witless, and implausible, with nonexistent direction and scythe-wielded editing."  Even star Suzanne Somers wrote disparagingly of the film in her autobiography, claiming it quickly became apparent during filming that credited director George Bloomfield was in over his head.  According to Somers, Donald Sutherland informally assumed direction of the actors as the making of the film continued. 
  
Numerous cast members of the Canadian comedy series SCTV turn up in bit parts in this film:  Joe Flaherty, Eugene Levy, Catherine O'Hara (in her film debut) and Tony Rosato.  This casting was entirely due to the connection with director George Bloomfield, who had also directed SCTV from 1977 to 1979, and who brought the SCTV actors into the fold for this film.  A similar casting situation occurred with Bloomfield's next film, Double Negative, released just two months after Nothing Personal.

Plot

Cast
 Donald Sutherland as Roger Keller
 Suzanne Somers as Abigail Adams
 Lawrence Dane as Ralston
 Roscoe Lee Browne as Paxton
 Dabney Coleman as Dickerson
 Sean McCann as Jake
 Chief Dan George as Oscar
 John Dehner as Senator
 David Steinberg as Talk Show Host
 Craig Russell as Talk Show Guest
 Sean Sullivan as Dean Collier
 Michael Wincott as Peter
 Catherine O'Hara as Audrey
 Douglas Campbell as Crichett, Sr.
 Jonathan Welsh as Critchett, Jr.
 Patricia Collins as Mrs. Ralston
 Maury Chaykin as Kanook
 Joe Flaherty as Patrol Car Policeman
 Eugene Levy as Marty
 Derek McGrath as Gas Jockey
 Tony Rosato as Pickup Truck Driver
 Angus MacInnes as Military Policeman
 Kate Lynch as Audrey Seltzer (uncredited)
 Saul Rubinek as Pete Braden (uncredited)

References

External links
Nothing Personal at New York Times

Nothing Personal at TCMDB

1980 films
1980 romantic comedy films
American romantic comedy films
Canadian romantic comedy films
English-language Canadian films
Films directed by George Bloomfield
1980s English-language films
1980s American films
1980s Canadian films